Malaita Province is the most populous and one of the largest of the nine provinces of Solomon Islands. It is named after its largest island, Malaita (also known as "Big Malaita" or "Maramapaina"). Other islands include South Malaita Island (also called "Small Malaita" or "Maramasike"), Sikaiana Island, and Ontong Java Atoll.

The provincial capital and largest urban center is Auki, which was established as the Administrative center for Malaita Province in 1909. Tourism is largely underdeveloped in Malaita; Auki is near to the Langa Langa Lagoon, which provides opportunities for snorkeling, and the villagers provide shell making demonstrations.

The population of the province is 122,620 (1999). The Melanesian population of Malaita has unique cultural traditions in social aspects of life. Brideprice is a tradition which is unique to Malaita compared to the other islands of the Solomon Islands. In this practice the groom's parents present customary money of shells and food to the bride's parents.

Ethnicity
The people of the main island are of Melanesian ethnicity. The outer islands of Ontong Java and Sikaiana are of a Polynesian ethnicity and are recognised as Polynesian outliers of Polynesian culture.

Traditional practices
Malaitan shell-money, manufactured in the Langa Langa Lagoon, is the traditional currency used in Malaita and throughout the Solomon Islands. The money consists of small polished shell disks which are drilled and placed on strings. It can be used as payment for bride price, funeral feasts and compensation, with the shell-money having a cash equivalent value. It is also worn as an adornment and status symbol. The standard unit, known as the tafuliae, is several strands 1.5 m in length. The shell money is still produced by the people of Langa Langa Lagoon, but much is inherited, from father to son, and the old traditional strings are now rare. 

The violation of cultural taboos and practices as well as causing personal offence is considered a cultural affront. Malaita culture calls for the exchange of valuables to ease and resolve the alienation that may thus arise. This is called fa abua or fa okae (compensation).

Reef Islands

The people of Langa Langa Lagoon and Lau Lagoon in Malaita, Solomon Islands built about 60 artificial islands on the reef including Funaafou, Foueda, Sulufou, Saua, Ferasubua and Adagege.

The inhabitance of these lagoons call themselves wane i asi 'sea people' as distinct from wane i tolo 'inland people' who live in the interior of the island. There was a history of conflict between the bush people and the salt-water people. The people of Lau Lagoon build islands on the reef as these provided protection against attack. These islands were formed literally one rock at a time. A family would take their canoe out to the reef which protects the lagoon and then dive for rocks, bring them to the surface and then return to the selected site and drop the rocks into the water. Living on the reef was also healthier as the mosquitoes, which infested the coastal swamps, were not found on the reef islands. The Lau people continue to live on the reef islands.

Administrative divisions
Malaita Province is sub-divided into the following wards:

 Malaita Province (137,596)
 Auki (5,105)
 Aimela (7,639)
 Buma (6,223)
 Fauabu (8,830)
 West Baegu/Fataleka (2,477)
 Mandalua/Folotana (2,749)
 Fo'ondo/Gwaiau (5,532)
 Malu'u (4,333)
 Matakwalao (2,760)
 Takwa (10,070)
 East Baegu (4,781)
 Fouenda (1,885)
 Sulufou/Kwarande (866)
 Sububenu/Burianiasi (5,094)
 Nafinua (4,195)
 Faumamanu/Kwai (3,592)
 Gulalofou (6,031)
 Waneagu/Taelanasina (3,478)
 Aiaisi (3,574)
 Areare (3,525)
 Raroisu'u (4,988)
 Aba/Asimeuru (4,936)
 Asimae (3,043)
 Mareho (2,550)
 Tai (4,650)
 Kwarekwareo (1,921)
 Siesie (3,747)
 Waneagu Silana Sina (5,121)
 Keaimela/Radefasu (9,634)
 Langalanga (1,922)
 Luaniua (1,396)
 Pelau (700)
 Sikaiana (249)

Islands
 Adagege
 Alite
 Anuta Paina
 Faore
 Ferasubua
 Foueda
 Funaafou
 Laulasi
 Maana'omba
 Malaita
 Matuavi
 Maramasike (South Malaita)
 Mbasakana
 Ndai
 Ontong Java
 Saua
 Sikaiana
 Sulufou
 Tehaolei

Notes

Footnotes

References 
 Roger Keesing, Kwaio Religion: The Living and the Dead in a Solomon Island Society. New York: Columbia University Press, 1982.
 Roger M. Keesing and Peter Corris. Lightning Meets the West Wind: The Malaita Massacre. Melbourne: Oxford University Press, 1980.
 Janet Kent. The Solomon Islands. Harrisburg, PA: Stackpole Books, 1972.
 James Page, 'Education and Acculturation on Malaita: An Ethnography of Intraethnic and Interethnic Affinities'.The Journal of Intercultural Studies. 1988. #15/16:74-81; available on-line at http://eprints.qut.edu.au/archive/00003566/.
 Ples Blong Iumi: Solomon Islands: The Past Four Thousand Years. Honiara: University of the South Pacific, 1989.
 Harold M. Ross. Baegu: Social and Ecological Organization in Malaita, Solomon Islands. Chicago: University of Illinois Press, 1973.

External links

 Provincial Profile of Malaita by constituency, People First Network 
 Malaita photo gallery from Ministry of Commerce and Tourism
 Digital Photo Library of Malaita from the People First Network 
 Arnon Atomea distance learning centre, Malaita

Provinces of the Solomon Islands
 
States and territories established in 1981